Ruby Wong Cheuk-ling (born 7 September 1971) is a Hong Kong actress and former model.

Filmography
 Infernal Mission (2004)
 Looking For Mr Perfect (2003)
 PTU (2003)
 Sai Kung Story (2003)
 U-Man (2002)
 Women From Mars (2002)
 Hit Team (2001)
 Loser's Club (2001)	
 Runaway (2001)
 Running Out of Time 2 (2001)
 Double Tap (2000)
 Needing You... (2000)
 Play With Strangers (2000)
 Night Club (1999)
 Running Out of Time (1999)
 Where A Good Man Goes (1999)
 Expect the Unexpected (1998)
 Killing Me Tenderly (1997)
 Lifeline (1997)
 Tamagotchi (1997)
 Too Many Ways to Be No. 1 (1997)
 Loving You (1995)

External links
 
 HK cinemagic entry

1971 births
Hong Kong film actresses
Living people
Hong Kong television actresses
Hong Kong women television presenters
Hong Kong voice actresses
20th-century Hong Kong actresses
21st-century Hong Kong actresses